Sara Angeline Groenewegen (born April 12, 1995) is a Canadian, former collegiate All-American, medal-winning Olympian, professional softball pitcher for the Canadian Wild of the National Pro Fastpitch (NPF). From 2014 to 2017, Groenewegen pitched for the University of Minnesota, where she hold the all-time strikeouts and strikeout ratio records. She also currently still ranks for both the Big Ten Conference and the NCAA Division I in the ratio category. She has played for the Canadian Wild in the NPF since being drafted second overall in 2017. She has been a member of the Canada women's national softball team since 2013. Groenewegen helped Team Canada win a bronze medal at the 2020 Summer Olympics.

Early life
Groenewegen was born on April 12, 1995, in White Rock, British Columbia, where she attended Elgin Park Secondary school, from where she graduated in 2013. Groenewegen was diagnosed with Type 1 Diabetes at the age of nine, but did not let this disease control her, persisting to become a member of the Canada women's national softball team at the age of 17. She has two sisters and comes from a 'softball family'.

College
Groenewegen finished her senior season at the University of Minnesota in 2017, where she developed a reputation as one of the most feared pitchers in the entire country, winning Big Ten Pitcher of the Year as a freshman, and repeated her senior year. She also won Big Ten Player of the Year her sophomore season for both her stellar offense and pitching performance throughout the season. Groenewegen has also become a feared hitter, hitting 36 career home runs in her time at Minnesota.

Groenewegen debuted on February 8 defeating the Murray State Racers with 7 strikeouts and six shutout innings; she also drove in a run with a hit. From February 8–23, Groenewgen posted a career best 10 game hit streak: she batted .414 (12/29) and accumulated 9 RBIs, four home runs, three doubles, 5 walks, scoring 5 runs for a .931% slugging percentage and striking out 5 times. Later on April 26, she no hit the Penn State Nittany Lions. In her sophomore campaign, Groenewegen achieved a career high of four hits to help defeat the Stetson Hatters on February 13, hitting two home runs and a double. On March 20, she also tallied two more home runs in a match with the Illinois Fighting Illini, collecting a career best six RBIs. Finally, on May 2 she struck out 19 batters vs. the Purdue Boilermakers in 8 innings for another career best total.

On February 13, the junior tossed 15 strikeouts against the Texas Tech Red Raiders to win the 7–4 game, the strikeouts were her high in regulation. Groenewegen would pitch her first perfect game over the FAU Owls on March 12. In her senior year, Groenewegen whiffed 9 of the California Golden Bears on March 15 to cross 1,000 for her career. She also had two career best streaks: beginning on April 2 to May 13, she won 16 consecutive games. During the streak she threw 98.1 innings, allowing 48 hits, 9 earned runs, 15 walks and fanned 155 batters for a 0.64 ERA and WHIP. In one of the games on April 28, she won her 100th game by no-hitting the Purdue Boilermakers in 5 innings with 12 strikeouts. During the same time on April 14–26, she also pitched 38.0 consecutive scoreless innings with 23 hits, four walks and 59 strikeouts for a 0.71 WHIP. Groenewegen made her last appearance as a Gopher on May 21 in a loss to the Alabama Crimson Tide, going for four innings, allowing a run and totaling 8 strikeouts during the NCAA Regionals.

International career
Groenewegen has been a member of the Canada women's national softball team since 2013, straight out of high school. Groenewegen has played a key role as mainly a pitcher on Team Canada. She led Canada to a gold medal at the 2015 Pan American Games in Toronto, Ontario, which was the first gold medal for Team Canada softball in 32 years. Winning that game also made Sara the youngest starting pitcher to earn a gold medal. At the 2019 Pan American Games in Lima, Peru, Groenewegen became Canada's first pitcher to throw a perfect game on August 5, 2019, versus Venezuela.

Groenewegen started for Team Canada throwing three shutout innings in the bronze medal game, eventually defeating Team Mexico 3–2 on July 27, 2021. She posted a win and had two hits for the team at the Tokyo games.

Professional career
Groenewegen was drafted in the first round of the 2017 NPF Draft by the Akron Racers as the second overall pick. In her second season in the National Pro Fastpitch league, Groenewegen was one of the league's top pitchers, earning All-NPF honors. She ended the 2019 season with a 1.52 ERA going 6–4 with three saves. She made 17 appearances, 11 starts, had 73.2 innings pitched, and struck out 64. She threw four complete games and one shut out. Groenewegen also plays in Athletes Unlimited and was one of the first athletes to sign their contract in 2019. After not competing in 2020 due to COVID, she debuted in the league's second season. She will return in 2022 for the third season.

Personal life 
Groenewegen has revealed she is gay.

Statistics

Minnesota Golden Gophers

References

External links
 
 
 
 

1995 births
Living people
People from White Rock, British Columbia
Canadian softball players
Minnesota Golden Gophers softball players
Softball players at the 2015 Pan American Games
Pan American Games gold medalists for Canada
Pan American Games medalists in softball
People with type 1 diabetes
Akron Racers players
Medalists at the 2015 Pan American Games
Medalists at the 2019 Pan American Games
Sportspeople from British Columbia
Softball players at the 2020 Summer Olympics
Olympic softball players of Canada
Medalists at the 2020 Summer Olympics
Olympic bronze medalists for Canada
Olympic medalists in softball
Lesbian sportswomen